Index to Fantasy and Science Fiction in Munsey Publications is a bibliography of science fiction stories that appeared magazines published by Frank Munsey. It was first published in book form in 1978 by William L. Crawford, without imprint in an edition of 100 copies. Although the book is uncredited, it may be a reprint of a bibliography done for the Fantasy Amateur Press Association by Bill Evans, 1945.

References
Notes

Bibliography

 
 

1978 books
American non-fiction books
Munsey
Science fiction studies
Fantasy